George Christos Timotheou (born 29 July 1997) is an Australian football player who plays as a centre-back for Melbourne Victory.

Club career
Timotheou started his professional career at Sydney FC, but never managed to break into the first team, instead playing in their reserve squad in the NPL. However halfway through his two-year contract, he left the club to sign for Sydney Olympic FC, where he made 27 appearances, during his 2 seasons there, before leaving to sign a deal with Bundesliga club Schalke 04.
Timotheou made his professional debut for Schalke 04 in the Bundesliga on 18 May 2019, starting in the home match against VfB Stuttgart. In November 2020, Timotheou returned to the A-League, signing with Adelaide United on a two-year deal.

Personal life
Timotheou was born in Canberra, Australia and is of Greek descent.

Honours

International 
Australia U20
 AFF U-19 Youth Championship: 2016

References

External links
 
 

1997 births
Living people
Sportspeople from Canberra
Soccer players from the Australian Capital Territory
Australian soccer players
Australia youth international soccer players
Australian expatriate soccer players
Australian expatriate sportspeople in Germany
Expatriate footballers in Germany
Expatriate footballers in Belgium
Australian people of Greek descent
Association football central defenders
Blacktown City FC players
Sydney Olympic FC players
Sydney FC players
FC Schalke 04 II players
FC Schalke 04 players
S.V. Zulte Waregem players
Adelaide United FC players
Bundesliga players
National Premier Leagues players
Belgian Pro League players